Linkéring is a rural community of Bonconto Arrondissement in the Vélingara Department, Kolda Region, Senegal.

References

Kolda Region
Communes of Senegal